David Bidzinayevich Kobesov (born 6 January 2000) is a Russian football player who plays for FC Khimki on loan from FC Pari Nizhny Novgorod.

Club career
He made his debut in the Russian Football National League for FC Alania Vladikavkaz on 1 August 2020 in a game against FC SKA-Khabarovsk, he substituted Batraz Gurtsiyev in the 55th minute.

On 13 July 2022, Kobesov signed a three-year contract with Russian Premier League club FC Pari Nizhny Novgorod. He made his RPL debut for Pari NN on 24 July 2022 against FC Khimki.

On 27 January 2023, Kobesov joined FC Khimki on loan, reuniting with Spartak Gogniyev who was his manager at Alania.

Career statistics

References

External links
 
 Profile by Russian Football National League
 

2000 births
Sportspeople from Vladikavkaz
Living people
Russian footballers
Association football midfielders
FC Spartak Vladikavkaz players
FC Nizhny Novgorod (2015) players
FC Khimki players
Russian Second League players
Russian First League players
Russian Premier League players